Cyril Edward Sweney (born 6 April 1889 or 1890), worked for the British-controlled Indian Civil Service and became Deputy Inspector General of Police in Madras, for which he received the King's police medal in 1924. His daughter was Susan Sweney.

References

British people of Irish descent
19th-century births
Year of birth uncertain
Year of death missing
British police officers in India
Recipients of the Queen's Police Medal